John E. B. Wofford (April 11, 1931 – August 22, 2021) was an American equestrian and Olympic medalist. He won a bronze medal in eventing at the 1952 Summer Olympics in Helsinki. He was born in Washington, D.C. He competed on his father's horse, Benny Grimes.

References

External links

1931 births
2021 deaths
Sportspeople from Washington, D.C.
American male equestrians
Olympic bronze medalists for the United States in equestrian
Equestrians at the 1952 Summer Olympics
Medalists at the 1952 Summer Olympics